Cardinal Adam Kozłowiecki, S.J., (1 April 1911 – 28 September 2007) was Archbishop of the Archdiocese of Lusaka in Zambia.

Biography
Born in Huta Komorowska, Austria-Hungary (now part of Poland) into a noble family of Ostoja coat of arms, Kozłowiecki was ordained a Jesuit priest on 24 June 1937 after studying at the Zakład Naukowo-Wychowawczy Ojców Jezuitów w Chyrowie. In 1939 he and 24 confrères were arrested by the Gestapo in Kraków and sent to Auschwitz. Six months later he was transferred to the Dachau concentration camp, where he remained until the end of the war.

After his release, the Vicar General proposed that Kozłowiecki go to Northern Rhodesia, where the Polish Jesuits had a mission. He taught there for several years until being appointed Apostolic Administrator of the new Prefecture of Lusaka in 1950. As the mission grew, he was named Bishop and Vicar Apostolic on 11 September 1955. In 1959 he was appointed the first Metropolitan Archbishop of Lusaka. He resigned from the see in 1969 so that an African could be appointed Archbishop.

He participated in all the sessions of the Second Vatican Council and in the first Synod of Bishops in 1967, and in the 1994 Special Assembly of the Synod of Bishops dedicated to Africa. After his resignation, he continued to serve as a missionary in Zambia. He was a member of the Congregation for the Evangelization of Peoples from 1970 to 1991.

He was created a Cardinal by John Paul II in the consistory of 21 February 1998; he was Cardinal-Priest of the Titulus S. Andreae in Quirinali. Because he reached 80 before becoming Cardinal, he was not eligible to participate in the 2005 conclave. He died on 28 September 2007.

The Cardinal received many recognitions, among them from President of Poland, Lech Kaczyński on 24 May 2007. The Adam Kozłowiecki Museum and Foundation, "Heart without Borders", was founded in his honor.

References

Sources 
 
pap, ss: Zmarł kardynał Kozłowiecki (pol.). wprost.pl, 2007-09-28. [dostęp 2011-06-20].
 Sprawozdanie Dyrekcji Zakładu Naukowo-Wychowawczego OO. Jezuitów w Bąkowicach pod Chyrowem za rok szkolny 1936/37. Przemyśl: 1937, s. 12.
 Prezydent RP nadał odznaczenie (pol.). prezydent.pl, 2007-05-24. [dostęp 2012-05-12].
M.P. z 2007 r. nr 57, poz. 641
 Odznaka Zasłużony dla Województwa Podkarpackiego. bip.podkarpackie.pl. [dostęp 2017-12-15].
 Honorowi obywatele gminy Majdan Królewski. majdankrolewski.pl. [dostęp 2016-07-11].
 Radio Watykańskie/a.: Sandomierz: Fundacja kard. Kozłowieckiego (pol.). info.wiara.pl, 2008-03-27. [dostęp 2011-06-20].
 Odsłonięcie tablicy upamiętniającej Ks. Kardynała Adama Kozłowieckiego (pol.). majdankrolewski.pl, 2008-10-03. [dostęp 2010-11-09].
 Powstało muzeum im. kard. Kozłowieckiego (pol.). deon.pl, 2011-09-24. [dostęp 2017-06-16]. [zarchiwizowane z tego adresu (2017-06-16)].

Bibliography 

 Sylwetka w słowniku biograficznym kardynałów Salvadora Mirandy
 Agata i Zbigniew Judyccy, Polonia. Słownik biograficzny, Warszawa 2000 (s. 155–156)
 Sylwetka na Catholic-Hierarchy.org

External links
 Catholic-pages bio of Adam Cardinal Kozłowiecki

1911 births
2007 deaths
20th-century Polish cardinals
21st-century Polish cardinals
Participants in the Second Vatican Council
Zambian Roman Catholic archbishops
Roman Catholic missionaries in Zambia
20th-century Polish Jesuits
Auschwitz concentration camp survivors
Dachau concentration camp survivors
Cardinals created by Pope John Paul II
Clan of Ostoja
Polish Roman Catholic missionaries
Jesuit archbishops
Jesuit cardinals
Roman Catholic bishops of Lusaka
Roman Catholic archbishops of Lusaka